, also known as Leon Kadena or Minamo Kusano, is a Japanese glamor-model and actress.

Life and career
Kadena was born in Osaka Prefecture on February 19, 1986. The former gravure idol had her first collection of nude photos published at age eighteen by Asahi Press in the photobook Naked Reon in June 2004. Kadena also appeared in a number of glamour videos including the September 2005 Reon Style released by Geneon Entertainment.

In July 2005, Kadena made her theatrical debut in the erotic drama Piikan Fūfu. Three years later in June 2008, she co-starred with fellow gravure idol Yuuri Morishita in the Toei comedy Secret Undercover Agent: Wild Cats in Strip Royale as secret agents Honey and Bunny who investigate strange incidents beyond the abilities of the regular police.

Kadena also appeared in a number of television dramas including being part of the regular cast for the TV Asahi action-mystery series  which was broadcast in 11 episodes from June to September 2009. In 2010 she played the role of Eren Komori in Kamen Rider × Kamen Rider OOO & W Featuring Skull: Movie War Core, an installment in the long-running Kamen Rider Series of tokusatsu films.

Filmography

DVDs
 Tri Puru H (2004, under the name Minamo Kusano)
 Leon (2004)
 Girl's Desire (2004) – also known as 'Gravure Idol'
 Virginity (2005)
 Reon Style (2005)
 Make You Happy (2006)
 My Reflection (2006)
 Memories (2006) – also known as 'Champion Gold Selection'
 Dream Planet (2007)

Films
  (July 2005)
  (July 2006)
 The Making of Dark Fantasy (December 2006) [Documentary]
  (June 2008)
 Kamen Rider × Kamen Rider OOO & W Featuring Skull: Movie War Core (December 2010)
  (June 2014)
  (September 2014)

Television
 Kamen Rider Ghost as Alia

Video games
 Metal Gear Solid 3: Snake Eater as Herself/Model

References

External links

 
 Kadena Official Website
 

Living people
1986 births
Japanese female adult models
Japanese gravure models
Japanese television personalities
Japanese actresses
People from Sakai, Osaka